Noel John McNamara (born 12 January 1938) is an Australian campaigner for victims of crime and critic of the Australian justice system. Both Noel McNamara and Beverley McNamara received the Medal of the Order of Australia in 2004 for service to the community, particularly through the Crime Victims Support Association Victoria.

See also
 Crime in Australia
 Crime in Melbourne

References

External links
 Crime Victims Support Association
 DoubleJeopardyReform.Org

Living people
Activists from Melbourne
1938 births
Recipients of the Medal of the Order of Australia